The All Creatures Great and Small franchise consists of a series of books, movies, and TV series based on books written by James Alfred Wight under the pen name James Herriot based on his experiences as a veterinary surgeon. The books have been adapted for film and television, including a 1975 film All Creatures Great and Small, followed by the 1976 It Shouldn't Happen to a Vet sequel, as well as a long-running BBC television programme of the same title, and a prequel series in 2011, Young James Herriot.

By 2020, the series of books featuring James Herriot had sold some 60 million copies. In that year, the next television production was aired, All Creatures Great and Small. The programme, produced for Channel 5 in the UK and PBS in the United States, was renewed for a second set of episodes, and then a third and fourth season.

Books
The book series focuses on the adventures of veterinary surgeon James Herriot and is set in the Yorkshire Dales, in the fictional town of Darrowby, based on a combination of Thirsk, Richmond, Leyburn and Middleham. In the books, Herriot works with fellow veterinary surgeons Siegfried and Tristan Farnon, based on real-life counterparts, Donald Sinclair and his brother Brian Sinclair respectively. Wight used the name Helen Alderson for his real-life wife, Joan Danbury. Danbury, in real life was not a farmer’s daughter, but worked as a secretary. According to one source, "contrary to the stories, Alf Wight met her in a group outing to a local dance. Evidently, he felt she was worth pursuing from the first, though she had a number of boyfriends and admirers."

In addition to the primary books listed below, a series of nine James Herriot Children’s Picture Books were published. Another 12 books, considered to be anthologies (with content taken from various of the primary books) was also published, some in the UK and others in the U.S.

UK series
If Only They Could Talk (1970) 
It Shouldn't Happen to a Vet (1972) 
Let Sleeping Vets Lie (1973) 
Vet in Harness (1974) 
Vets Might Fly (1976) 
Vet in a Spin (1977) 
The Lord God Made Them All (1981) 
Every Living Thing (1992)

U.S. series
In the United States, the books were collected as pairs into omnibus volumes because the publisher thought they were too short to publish independently. The title for the first book in the series All Creatures Great and Small (and subsequently of the movies and television series) was taken from the hymn "All Things Bright and Beautiful". According to Herriot's son, it was his sister who suggested the title, initially proposing All Creatures Great and Small.

 All Creatures Great and Small (1972) (incorporating If Only They Could Talk and It Shouldn't Happen to a Vet) 
 All Things Bright and Beautiful (1974) (incorporating Let Sleeping Vets Lie and Vet in Harness) 
 All Things Wise and Wonderful (1977) (incorporating Vets Might Fly and Vet in a Spin) 
 The Lord God Made Them All (1980)
 Every Living Thing (1981)
 James Herriot's Dog Stories (1986)

Media overview

Films

All Creatures Great and Small (1975)

All Creatures Great and Small is based on the first two novels, If Only They Could Talk (1970) and It Shouldn't Happen to a Vet (1972), and was given the same title as the 1972 U.S. compilation volume of these two novels. It was released in 1975. It was directed by Claude Whatham, and written by Hugh Whitemore, and starred Simon Ward as James Herriot and Anthony Hopkins as Siegfried Farnon.

It Shouldn't Happen to a Vet (1976)

It Shouldn't Happen to a Vet is based on the two subsequent novels, Let Sleeping Vets Lie (1973) and Vet in Harness (1974), and was released in 1976. It was directed by Eric Till, written by Alan Plater, and starred John Alderton as James Herriot and Colin Blakely as Siegfried Farnon.

Television

All Creatures Great and Small (1978–1990)

All Creatures Great and Small is a BBC television series based initially on the first two books, If Only They Could Talk (1970) and It Shouldn't Happen to a Vet (1972). As the novels are written in an episodic style, with each chapter generally containing a short story within the ongoing narrative of Herriot's life, this facilitated their adaptation for a television series by producer Bill Sellars. The series stars Christopher Timothy as James Herriot and Robert Hardy as Siegfried Farnon, and it had two runs: the original (1978 to 1980, based directly on Herriot's books) was for three series; the second (1988 to 1990, filmed with original scripts) for four. Series 4 saw the introduction of new vet, Calum Buchanan (John McGlynn), based on Herriot's real-life assistant Brian Nettleton. A total of ninety episodes were broadcast.

Young James Herriot (2011)

Young James Herriot is a three-part BBC television series based on the life of veterinary student James Herriot. It was based on notes in the Herriot archive and the archives of the Glasgow Veterinary College, including the diaries and case notes the author kept during his student years, and was produced with the cooperation of his family. The series was directed by Michael Keillor and written by Ann McManus and Eileen Gallagher. It stars Iain De Caestecker as Herriot, with Amy Manson and Ben Lloyd-Hughes as fellow students Whirly Tyson and Rob McAloon.

All Creatures Great and Small (2020–)

In 2019, Channel 5 announced it would be filming a new series in the Yorkshire Dales over the summer of 2019, to be broadcast the following year. Instead of using Askrigg as the filming base, the producers decided on Grassington, due to the former's A roads detracting from the 1930s look they wanted. There was never a plan to film in Thirsk where the actual James Herriot (Alf Wight) practiced because it had become too large for the small-town feel that the series wanted.

Significant changes were made from the source material (both the previous television series and the memoir), such as Siegfried Farnon being a heartbroken widower and a dramatically increased role for Mrs. Hall, who has been reimagined as a young, live-in housekeeper and a "slightly warmer figure" than in the novels. The role of Helen was also greatly expanded.

This first series consisted of six episodes plus a Christmas special and aired first on Channel 5 (in 2020) and then (in early 2021) on PBS in the United States. All Creatures Great and Small was renewed for a second series. All of the principal actors were expected to return to their roles. It was scheduled to begin filming in the Yorkshire Dales in late March 2021.

The World of James Herriot

The World of James Herriot is a writer's home museum attraction in Thirsk, North Yorkshire, England.

The museum was set up in 1999 by Hambleton District Council; the business was sold to private investors in 2011 and was re-generated in 2017. Council leases the building to the operators but retains ownership of the structure. As of February 2021, the World of James Herriot Ltd board included the daughter and son of Alf Wight: Rosie Page and retired vet John Wight, in addition to a group of "local businessmen and women".

See also
All Creatures Great and Small

References

External links

James Alfred Wight OBE (thirsk.org.uk)

British film series
Television franchises
Veterinary medicine in the United Kingdom
20th-century British children's literature